Thomas Elder (1818–1897) was a Scottish-Australian pastoralist, businessman, philanthropist and politician.

Thomas Elder may also refer to:

Murray Elder, Baron Elder (Thomas Murray Elder, born 1950), British Labour politician and member of the House of Lords
Thomas Elder (lawyer) (1767–1853),  Harrisburg lawyer and businessman
Thomas Elder (Lord Provost of Edinburgh) (1731–1799), Scottish wine merchant
Thomas C. Elder (1834–1904), Civil War soldier and Virginia lawyer

See also